The 2017–18 Northeastern Huskies men's basketball team represented Northeastern University during the 2017–18 NCAA Division I men's basketball season. The Huskies, led by 12th-year head coach Bill Coen, played their home games at Matthews Arena in Boston, Massachusetts as members of the Colonial Athletic Association. They finished the season 23–10, 14–4 in CAA play win a share of the regular season title with College of Charleston. They defeated Delaware and UNC Wilmington to advance to the championship game of the CAA tournament where they lost to College of Charleston. Despite having 23 wins, they did not participate in a postseason tournament.

Previous season 
The Huskies finished the 2016–17 season 15–16, 8–10 in CAA play to finish in sixth place. They lost in the quarterfinals of the CAA tournament to Towson.

Offseason

Departures

Incoming transfers

Recruiting

Roster

Schedule and results 

|-
!colspan=9 style=| Non-conference regular season

|-
!colspan=9 style=| CAA regular season

|-
!colspan=9 style=| CAA tournament

See also
2017–18 Northeastern Huskies women's basketball team

References

Northeastern Huskies men's basketball seasons
Northeastern